The 13th National Geographic Bee was held in Washington, D.C. on May 23, 2001, sponsored by the National Geographic Society. The final competition was moderated by Jeopardy! host Alex Trebek. The winner was Kyle Haddad-Fonda of Shoreline, Washington, who won a $25,000 college scholarship and lifetime membership in the National Geographic Society. The 2nd-place winner, Nick Jachowski of Makawao, Hawaii, won a $15,000 scholarship. The 3rd-place winner, Jason Ferguson of Dallas, Texas, won a $10,000 scholarship.

References

External links
 National Geographic Bee Official Website

National Geographic Bee